Army Green is one of football sections that represents Indian Army. The team regularly participates in the Durand Cup and various regional tournaments. The team's major achievement was in 2016 Durand Cup as the won the title beating NEROCA FC in the final.

Honours

Domestic
Durand Cup
Champions (1): 2016

See also
 Army Red
 Indian Air Force
 Indian Navy
 Services football team
 Indian Army Service Corps

References

Military association football clubs in India
Organizations with year of establishment missing